William Parra Sinisterra (1 March 1995) is a footballer from Colombia who plays as a defender for Deportes Tolima.

Career

Club
On 17 June 2019, Parra joined HJK on loan until the end of the 2019 season, with the option of an additional year and making the transfer permanent.

Parra signed with Moldovan team, Sheriff Tiraspol, on 20 December 2019.

Career statistics

Club

References

1995 births
Living people
Colombian footballers
Association football defenders
Categoría Primera A players
Veikkausliiga players
Moldovan Super Liga players
Independiente Medellín footballers
La Equidad footballers
Helsingin Jalkapalloklubi players
FC Sheriff Tiraspol players
Deportes Tolima footballers
Colombian expatriate footballers
Expatriate footballers in Finland
Expatriate footballers in Moldova
Colombian expatriate sportspeople in Finland
Colombian expatriate sportspeople in Moldova
Sportspeople from Nariño Department